Lucile Allorge (Boiteau; born 1937) is a Madagascar-born French botanist.

Biography
Lucile Boiteau was born in Antananarivo, Madagascar, October 25, 1937. Her father, Pierre Boiteau, was the founder and director of the Botanical and Zoological Garden of Tsimbazaza. Allorge holds a doctorate in botanical sciences.

She is a member of many learned societies, including the Société botanique de France where she won the 2011 .

She joined the French National Centre for Scientific Research (CNRS) in 1968. An honorary attaché at the National Museum of Natural History, France (MNHN), she has carried out numerous missions in French Guiana, Madagascar, the Philippines, Venezuela and Malaysia. Allorge has published more than 100 scientific articles. She has been named Knight of the National Order of Merit of Madagascar. In 2007, she was elected to the Académie des sciences d'outre-mer as a corresponding member of the 4th section. She is a member of the Société des explorateurs français.

Eponymy
 Liliaceae Aloe lucile-allorgeae Rauh 
 Crassulaceae Kalanchoe lucile-allorgei Rauh & Mangeldorf
 Buthidae Tityobuthus lucileae

Awards and honours
 Prix de Coincy, 2011
 Knight of the National Order of Merit of Madagascar

Selected works
 Lucile Allorge, Plantes de Madagascar : atlas. Plaissan :  MUSEO (1st ed. 2008), 2017 
 Lucile Allorge (collaborator), Je sais utiliser mes huiles essentielles. Paris : Rue de l’échiquier, 2016 
 Collective work under the direction of Lucile Allorge and Thomas Haevermans, Namoroka : mission à Madagascar. Toulouse : Privat ; Paris : Muséum National d'Histoire Naturelle, 2015
 Yves Delange, Yves-Marie Allain, Françoise-Hélène Jourda, Lucile Allorge, Les serres : le génie architectural au service des plantes. Arles : Actes Sud, 2013.
 Régine Rosenthal, Lucile Allorge, Jean-Noël Burte, Christian Messier, Origines : les forêts primaires dans le monde. Toulouse : Éditions Privat, 2012
 Lucile Allorge-Boiteau and Maxime Allorge, Faune et flore de Madagascar. Paris : Karthala, 2011
 Lucile Allorge-Boiteau, Régine Rosenthal, Madagascar : l'Eden fragile : biodiversité. Toulouse : Éditions Privat, 2010
 Lucile Allorge, Plantes de Madagascar : atlas. Paris : Ulmer, 2008
 Lucile Allorge, La fabuleuse odyssée des plantes : les botanistes voyageurs, les jardins des plantes, les herbiers. Paris : JC Lattès, 2003 (prix Émile Gallé)
 Suzanne Mollet and Lucile Allorge, Histoire du Parc Botanique et Zoologique de Tsimbazaza Éditions Alzieu, Grenoble, 2000
 Pierre Boiteau, Marthe Boiteau and Lucile Allorge, Dictionnaire des noms malgaches des végétaux  Éditions Alzieu. Grenoble. 1999
 Pierre Boiteau, Lucile Allorge-Boiteau, Kalanchoe (Crassulacées) de Madagascar : systématique, écophysiologie et phytochimie. Paris : Karthala, 1995
 Pierre Boiteau and Lucile Allorge-Boiteau, Plantes médicinales de Madagascar. Paris : Karthala, 1993
 Scientific direction of the republication of l'illustration des genres by Jean-Baptiste Lamarck, 1000 plates, 10 volumes. Paris : Éditions Amarca, 1989. Translation into Spanish by Liber Ediciones, 1995.
 Lucile Allorge, Monographie des Apocynacées - Tabernaemontanoïdées américaines. Muséum national d'Histoire naturelle, Paris, (Mémoires du Muséum national d'Histoire naturelle, Sér. B – Botanique (1950-1992) ; 30). 1985.

Exhibitions
 Botanical passions: naturalists travelers at the time of the great discoveries: exhibition, Ploézal, Domaine départemental de la Roche Jagu, 7 June-9 November 2008. Rennes: Ouest-France, 2008

Filmography 
 Sur la piste de Wallace, expedition to the Philippines in January 2000 under the direction of Patrice Franceschi. DVD.
 Les sortilèges de l’île rouge Madagascar, Ankarana, in November 2001, director Alain Tixier, Ushuaïa Nicolas Hulot, DVD.
 Le labyrinthe secret de Namoroka, directors Jean-Michel Corillion and Isabelle Coulon

References

1937 births
Living people
People from Antananarivo
20th-century French botanists
21st-century French botanists